"Fade Away" is a song by New Zealand band Six60, released as a single in November 2020, during promotion for the band's documentary film Six60: Till the Lights Go Out. The song was the most played track on New Zealand radio by a domestic artist in 2021.

Background and composition

The song was written and produced by the band members in collaboration with American music producers Jake One and Malay, and is a pop ballad that features elements of hip-hop.

Release and promotion 

"Fade Away" was released as a single on 13 November 2020. The song's release coincided with the world premiere of band's documentary Six60: Till the Lights Go Out (2020). After the release of the track, the band performed Six60 Saturdays, a summer tour of New Zealand held across six dates in January and February 2021.

At the 2021 Aotearoa Music Awards, "Fade Away" was recognised as the song most played on radio for the year.

Credits and personnel
Credits adapted from Tidal.

Jacob Dutton – songwriting
Marlon Gerbes – songwriting
James Ho – production, songwriting
Dave Kutch – mastering engineer
Raul Lopez – mixer
Paul Shelton – songwriting
Six60 – performer
Matiu Walters – songwriting

Charts

Year-end charts

Certifications

References

2020 singles
2020 songs
New Zealand songs
Six60 songs
Songs written by Malay (record producer)